Walter Rantasa (born 14 February 1966 in Vienna) is an Austrian rower. He finished fifth in the men's lightweight double sculls at the 1996 Summer Olympics.

References 
 
 

1966 births
Living people
Sportspeople from Vienna
Austrian male rowers
Olympic rowers of Austria
Rowers at the 1996 Summer Olympics
World Rowing Championships medalists for Austria